RIT Ambulance (RITA) is a community run, 911 dispatched, volunteer collegiate New York State Certified Basic Life Support Ambulance Agency, run under the Rochester Institute of Technology Student Health Center. The ambulance serves the entire Rochester Institute of Technology campus.

RIT Ambulance provides coverage 24 hours a day, 7 days a week throughout the year. The ambulance is staffed on a volunteer basis by students, faculty, staff, alumni, and community members.

History
Shortly after RIT's move from inner city Rochester to the existing campus in Henrietta, an old barn that was left on the purchased property caught fire and began to burn. Alpha Phi Omega (APO) brother Neil Gorfain roused his fellow APO brothers and began to direct traffic as emergency service personnel began to respond. Eventually, Student Housing was plagued by frequent fire alarms as the campus grew and matured. The evacuating students were often in the way of Pinkerton Security officers and each other. Consequently, after the barn incident, the Xi Zeta chapter of Alpha Phi Omega proposed adopting crowd control as one of their mandated services to the institute. Soon after, Student Housing consented to this plan. Whenever a fire alarm sounded, campus security would notify the on-call APO brother via room phone, who would rouse his brothers and move the crowd to a safe distance until the building was cleared. This band of Fraternity brothers were designated the Emergency Unit (EU).

In 1970, when the majority of the EU members were graduating, APO made the decision to open the organization to non-fraternity members.  That same year, a student in hypoglycemic shock was found in the first floor of building 35 (Kate Gleason Hall). The Pinkerton Security officers, due to a lack of first aid training, restrained multiple students, an ambulance volunteer, and U.S. Army Medics trying to help. The student was saved with some quick thinking and a sugar shaker until Henrietta Ambulance was called to the scene. Following this incident, the restrained medics and ambulance volunteers decided to join the EU, where a significant change could be made on campus. The unit changed its credo to  "No member of the RIT Community should lose their life due to ignorance or lack of training and experience on the part of others." A volunteer leader of the new unit was selected, and Student Housing withdrew their sponsorship, recognizing a change in the organization's objectives.

In the fall quarter of 1970, the group reconvened, and under the Medical Direction of Dr. Hugh H. Butler the group was given first aid kits once their training was complete. Dr. Butler agreed to aid the group in triage and case review. Due to the conflict in  Vietnam, and the still fresh Kent state shooting, many departments on campus were opposed to such a "militaristic medical organization" on campus. As the matter of fact, student support for the organization was strong, and one evening hundreds of students disrupted a boardroom meeting in an anti-war protest, causing the board of trustees to shut the institute down for a week. Keith Taylor, President of the Student Association, was vehemently opposed to the EU, fearing the possibility that the organization rendering aid would result in death or other situations in which the institute would be liable. Nevertheless, Dr. Butler stood his ground for the agency, and Scott McLeod, VP of SA, gave a passionate speech that swayed many voting members. The Student Association advised adopting the name Student Safety Unit, following a passing vote of overwhelming margin. The RIT Student Safety Unit was created.

In the beginning, students were outfitted with over-sized blue and yellow windbreakers, yellow-rimmed flashlights, and first aid kits. In addition, Student Association did not provide any funding, so the members paid for their own uniforms. The unit was given an old panel van, Van #7, that was frequently out of service for repairs. When #7 was unavailable, a patrol car was used to retrieve students from hospitals following transport by Henrietta Ambulance. Eventually, however, as call volume climbed first from 10, to 15, to 100 in a year, agency members got into great shape, a natural consequence of having to sprint down the quarter-mile walkway for a medical emergency on the academic side of campus. In 1971, the agency acquired a member certified by the American Red Cross to conduct first aid training, meaning members did not have to be certified through Henrietta Ambulance. In the summer of 1972, SSU helped sandbag the Genesee River in preparation for Hurricane Agnes.  That same year RIT purchased a Ford station wagon, made available to SSU, offering increased comfort, and reliability to students being transported. In 1973, the SSU received a new red van exclusively for SSU use. Fuel, repairs, and insurance were covered by administration. This vehicle did not have emergency lights, as most areas of campus were accessible very quickly. In the fall of 1974, SSU decided to make a commitment to provide 24/7 coverage to campus, with the number of EMTs in the organization approaching 50% in 1975. By the end of 1976, the number of calls SSU had provided assistance to was approaching 1,000.

In 1981, RIT's Student Safety team became a certified ambulance agency known as RIT Emergency Medical Unit. A year later, in 1982, it was announced that non-emergency transportation would be discontinued.  In 1983, the organization was renamed to RIT Ambulance.

For many years the RIT Ambulance was only dispatched to emergencies by RIT Public Safety, but in 1993 RIT Ambulance became a Monroe County EMS subscriber. Subscription to the Monroe County system served to ensure that 9-1-1 calls on the RIT Campus would be appropriately routed to RIT Ambulance rather than to Henrietta Ambulance.

Organizational structure
RIT Ambulance is governed by a constitution which defines two different organizational divisions.  The Executive Board is the primary body for organizational oversight and personnel management.  The Operations Staff is in charge of handling the day to day issues of the ambulance agency.  The structure of these groups is listed below.

The Executive Board is elected by the membership. Positions are filled by election each April, and vacancies are filled by appointment, except in the case of President and Chief, in which case the Vice President and Deputy Chief which take over the respective positions. The only member of the Operations Staff that is directly elected by the membership is the Chief of Operations. The Chief is then responsible for appointing well-qualified personnel to the Operations Staff, including the Deputy Chief, Captains, Training Director, and Equipment Director. Members then vote to ratify these appointments at the next monthly membership meeting.

The current Executive Board is as follows:

. * Indicates ratification via appointment by the President due to a vacancy in a position
. ** Promoted automatically per constitution due to a vacancy in the position

The current Operations Staff is as follows:

Membership
RIT Ambulance membership is open to RIT students, faculty, staff, alumni and community members. While anyone can be a member, a great deal of training and commitment is required to become cleared in a position.  Members who have cleared are assigned a 6Mxxx radio identifier and are allowed to work without a trainer on the ambulance or first response vehicle.

Positions
RIT Ambulance members work in at least one of several areas:

Training
Members must work through various stages of qualification, with each stage having additional training and added responsibility. Typically, a member would progress through the following stages:

Vehicles

RIT Ambulance operates two emergency vehicles

Both vehicles carry a variety of medical supplies and equipment including oxygen, oral glucose gel, defibrillators, albuterol, aspirin, naloxone, and epinephrine which allow life saving response to emergencies.

Relations with other emergency organizations
RIT Ambulance receives its right to function from the New York State Department of Health, the Rochester Institute of Technology, and the RIT Student Health Center.

RIT Ambulance responds to all medical emergencies on RIT's campus. RIT Ambulance may also respond to calls off the RIT campus, as determined by the Monroe County Emergency Communications Department (ECD.) RIT Ambulance is also a member of the National Collegiate Emergency Medical Services Foundation.

References

External links
 

Rochester Institute of Technology
Ambulance services in the United States
Collegiate EMS agencies
Medical and health organizations based in New York (state)